Panicum lycopodioides, common name false club-moss panic grass or (in French) panic faux-lycopode, is endemic to the French island of Réunion in the Indian Ocean. It is found at high altitudes on the island, at elevations over 2000 m (6700 feet). The highest point on the island is Piton des Neiges, 3069 m (10,230 feet). The plant requires full sun-light and a cold climate.

The specific epithet "lycopodioides" means "similar to Lycopodium" in reference to the plant's general habitus superficially resembling certain species of club-moss. Stems grow horizontally, branching frequently, thus forming mats pressed against the ground. Leaves are small, pressed against the stem like the scales of Lycopodium.

References

lycopodioides
Flora of Réunion
Grasses of Africa
Taxa named by Christian Gottfried Daniel Nees von Esenbeck